Response may refer to:
Call and response (music),  musical structure
Reaction (disambiguation)
Request–response
Output or response, the result of telecommunications input
Response (liturgy), a line answering a versicle
Response (music) or antiphon, a response to a psalm or other part of a religious service
Response, a phase in emergency management
Response rate (survey)

Proper names and titles
Response, a print and online magazine of Christian thought published by Seattle Pacific University
Response (album), a studio album by Phil Wickham
Response (company), a call centre company based in Scotland
The Response (film)
The National War Memorial (Canada), titled The Response
The Northumberland Fusiliers Memorial in Newcastle upon Tyne, titled "The Response"

See also
Action (disambiguation)
Answer (disambiguation)
Reply (disambiguation)
Response variable, or the realization thereof
Responsions, an examination formerly required for a degree at Oxford University
Stimulus (disambiguation), evokes a response
Stimulus–response model, in statistics
Transient response (electrical and mechanical engineering)